Yeshu is an Indian Hindi-language drama television series broadcasting on &TV. It premiered on 22 December 2020 and produced by Arvind Babbal. It starring Sonali Nikam , Aarya Dharmchand Kumar and Vivaan Shah.

Plot 
which depicts the childhood of Yeshu Masih (Jesus Christ). This series showcases Yeshu's miracles and how he helped people with his healing powers in a world afflicted by sins and evil. The show also focusses on Yeshu's special bond with his mother.

Cast

Main 
 Vivaan Shah as Yeshu
 Sonali Nikam as mother mary
 Aarya DharmChand Kumar as joseph

Recurring 
 Giriraj Kabra as Devtoot
 Pooja Dixit as Maria
 Vikey Ahuja as rabbi guru
 Sarthak Mohan Chorghe as james
 Misha Krishna Kataria as Ashiya
 Khabir Mehta as Yakub
 Tanishq Jain as Simon
 Pushkar Priyadarshi as Mannu's Father

Production 
Arvind Babbal's series was supposed to premiere on March 2020. However, owing COVID-19 outbreak, the production and filming of television series were stalled. But, due to imposed lockdown which extended, it could not be resumed. When the shootings of the series were permitted from October 2020, the production and filming of the series resumed and the team decides to release the series in December. But finally the series premiered on 22 December 2020. It produced by Arvind Babbal, through his studio, Arvind Babbal Productions.

References 

2020 Indian television seasons
2020 Indian television series debuts
Indian drama television series
Hindi-language television